Topography may refer to:

Cartography, geology and oceanography

 Topography, the study of the current terrain features of a region and the graphic representation of the landform on a map
 Inverted topography, landscape features that have reversed their elevation relative to other features
 Karst topography, a landscape on soluble rock, characterized by underground drainage systems with sinkholes and caves
 Ocean surface topography, the difference between the surface of the ocean and the geoid
 Shuttle Radar Topography Mission, a research effort that obtained digital elevation models on a near-global scale from 56 °S to 60 °N, to generate the most complete high-resolution digital topographic database of Earth to date
 Topographic maps
 Topographic prominence, a concept used in the categorization of hills and mountains, also known as peaks
 Local history, formerly commonly called "topography"

Culture and media

Art
 Topographical views
 Topography of Terror, an outdoor museum in Berlin
 New Topographics, a photography exhibit in Rochester, NY, 1975-1976

Literature
 Christian Topography, a 6th-century book written by Cosmas Indicopleustes which advances the idea that the world is flat

Science

Medicine
 The location of features in the body, see human brain and topographical codes
 Corneal topography, a non-invasive medical imaging technique for mapping the surface curvature of the cornea, the outer structure of the eye

Ornithology
 The study of feather tracts, see the list of terms used in bird topography

Physics
 Diffraction topography, an X-ray imaging technique based on Bragg diffraction, in which diffraction from a crystal is recorded on film or by detector, resulting in topographic images (topographs)

Technology
 The detailed design of a semiconductor integrated circuit, see integrated circuit layout design protection and the Integrated Circuit Topography Act